Mint or The Mint may refer to:

Plants
 Lamiaceae, the mint family
 Mentha, a genus of the mint family

Coins and collectibles
 Mint (facility), a facility for manufacturing coins
 Mint condition, a state of like-new quality

Arts and entertainment

Fictional entities
 Mint, in the video game Threads of Fate
 Mint, a Ranma ½ character
 Mint Adnade, in the video game Tales of Phantasia
 Mint Aizawa, in the anime and manga Tokyo Mew Mew
 Mint Blancmanche, in the video game/anime series Galaxy Angel

Film and television 
 Mint (2014 film), a Japanese drama
 The Mint (film), a 2015 American comedy
 The Mint (Australia game show), 2007–2008
 The Mint (British game show), 2006–2007

Music
 Mint (band), a Belgian music group
 Mint Records, a record label
 Mint (Alice Merton album), 2019
 Mint, a 1983 album by Meiko Nakahara 
 Mint, a 2003 album by Alexkid in collaboration with Liset Alea
 "Mint" (Namie Amuro song), 2016
 "Mint" (Rina Aiuchi song), 2007
 "Mint" (Lindsay Ell song), 2017
 "Mint" (Misako Uno song), 2019
 "The Mint", a song by Earl Sweatshirt from the 2018 album Some Rap Songs

Literature
 Mint (newspaper), a business newspaper published in India
 The Mint (book), by T. E. Lawrence, 1955

Businesses, organisations and products
 Mint (restaurant), in Dublin, Ireland
 Malaysian Institute of Nuclear Technology Research, now Malaysian Nuclear Agency
 Minor International, a hospitality company, Stock Exchange of Thailand symbol MINT
 Mint Airways, a former Spanish airline
 MiNT camera, a company specializing in instant cameras and accessories
 Mint Mobile, a mobile virtual network operator in the United States
 Mint Productions, an Irish TV production company
 The Mint Las Vegas, a hotel and casino in Las Vegas 1957–1989
 JetBlue Mint, a premium cabin service of JetBlue
 Mint, a robot by Evolution Robotics
 Ministry of Innovation and Technology (Ethiopia)

Computing
 Mint (web analytics software), discontinued 2016
 MiNT, an operating system for the Atari ST
 Intuit Mint, formerly Mint.com, a personal financial management website and mobile app
 Linux Mint, a distribution of the Linux operating system

Places
 Mint, Arizona, U.S.
 Liberty of the Mint, or The Mint, a district in Southwark, London, England
 River Mint, in Cumbria, England
 Mint River, in Alaska, U.S.
 The Mint (Carlingford), a fortified house and museum in Ireland
 Vallalar Nagar, Chennai, India, popularly called Mint

Other uses
 Mint (candy), a food item flavoured with mint
 MINT (economics), the economies of Mexico, Indonesia, Nigeria, and Turkey
 Mint (singer) (born 1994), a Thai singer based in South Korea
 Mint, a shade of the colour spring green

See also

 Mint Street (disambiguation)
 Minter (disambiguation)
 Minto (disambiguation)
 Minton (disambiguation)
 Minty (disambiguation)
 Mintz, a surname
 Spearmint (disambiguation)
 Peppermint  (disambiguation)